San Luis Valley Regional Airport  (Bergman Field) is two miles south of Alamosa, in Alamosa County, Colorado, United States. It sees one airline, subsidized by the Essential Air Service program. The airport reached 10,000 enplanements for the first time in its EAS participation with Boutique Air and is now classified as a non-hub primary airport.

History 
The airport was conceived in 1939 and construction began later that year. It was opened in early 1941.  It is now owned by the City and County of Alamosa and is named for Carl A. Bergman (1908–1988), a local businessman and initial supporter of the airport. The first airline flights were Monarch DC-3s in 1946–47; Monarch's successor Frontier started service in 1982 with Convair 580's.

Facilities
The airport covers 1,700 acres (688 ha) at an elevation of 7,539 feet (2,298 m). It has one runway: 2/20 is 8,519 by 100 feet (2,597 x 30 m) asphalt .

In the year ending January 1, 2011 the airport had 30,772 aircraft operations, average 84 per day: 73% general aviation, 23% air taxi, and 3% military. 44 aircraft were then based at the airport: 84% single-engine, 14% multi-engine, and 2% helicopter. The airport is an uncontrolled airport that has no control tower.

Airline and destination

Scheduled passenger service:

Statistics

Top destinations

References

Other sources 

 Essential Air Service documents (Docket OST-1997-2960) from the U.S. Department of Transportation:
 Order 2006-7-19: selecting Great Lakes Aviation, Ltd. to provide subsidized essential air service (EAS) at Alamosa and Cortez, Colorado for two years, beginning August 1, 2006. Alamosa will receive three nonstop round trips to Denver each weekday and weekend (18 total round trips per week) at an annual subsidy rate of $1,150,268. Cortez will receive three nonstop round trips to Denver each weekday and weekend at an annual subsidy rate of $796,577. Each community will be served with 19-passenger Beech 1900-D aircraft.
 Order 2008-5-34: reselecting Great Lakes Aviation, Ltd., d/b/a United Express, to provide essential air service (EAS) at annual subsidy rates of $1,853,475 at Alamosa, Colorado, and $1,295,562 at Cortez, through July 31, 2010.
 Order 2010-7-5: selecting Great Lakes Aviation, Ltd., to continue providing subsidized essential air service (EAS) at Alamosa and Cortez, Colorado, for the two-year period beginning August 1, 2010, at the annual subsidy rates of $1,987,155 and $1,847,657, respectively.

External links 
 Official website
 San Luis Valley Regional Airport at Colorado DOT website
 
 Aircraft Owners and Pilots Association - Airport Information
 History

Airports in Colorado
Essential Air Service
Buildings and structures in Alamosa County, Colorado
Transportation in Alamosa County, Colorado